Hyalurga sora is a moth of the family Erebidae. It was described by Jean Baptiste Boisduval in 1870. It is found in Mexico, Guatemala and Panama.

References

 

Hyalurga
Moths described in 1870